For information on all Lamar University sports, see Lamar Cardinals and Lady Cardinals

The 2022–23 Lamar Lady Cardinals basketball team represents Lamar University during the 2022–23 NCAA Division I women's basketball season. The Lady Cardinals, led by fourth year head coach Aqua Franklin, play their home games at the Montagne Center in Beaumont, Texas as members of the Southland Conference.

The Lady Cardinals return to the Southland Conference following one year as members of the Western Athletic Conference. Lamar was one of four schools, all from Texas, that left the Southland Conference in July 2021 to join the WAC.

Previous season
The Lady Cardinals finished the 2021–22 season with an overall record of 14–15 and 8–10 in conference play. After defeating New Mexico State in the opening round of the 2022 WAC women's basketball tournament, their season ended losing to Sam Houston State in a first round game.  Lamar entered the tournament as seventh seed.

Offseason

Incoming transfers

Incoming recruits

Source:

Preseason polls

Southland Conference Poll
The Southland Conference released its preseason poll on October 25, 2022. Receiving 103 overall votes, the Lady Cardinals were picked to finish fourth in the conference.

Preseason All Conference
Akasha Davis was selected to the Preseason All Conference second team.

Roster

Schedule
Sources:

|-
!colspan=12 style=| Exhibition

|-
!colspan=12 style=| Non-Conference season

|-
!colspan=12 style=| Southland Conference season

|-
!colspan=9 style=|2023 Jersey Mike's Subs Southland Conference Tournament

Source:

See also 
2022–23 Lamar Cardinals basketball team

References 

Lamar Lady Cardinals basketball seasons
Lamar
Lamar Lady Cardinals basketball
Lamar Lady Cardinals basketball